White Witch Doctor is a 1953 Technicolor adventure film directed by Henry Hathaway and starring Susan Hayward, Robert Mitchum, and Walter Slezak. Made by 20th Century Fox, it was produced by Otto Lang from a screenplay by Ivan Goff and Ben Roberts, based on the 1950 novel by Louise Allender Stinetorf (1900-1992). The music score (notable for its use of the serpent, an obsolete instrument) was by Bernard Herrmann, and the cinematography by Leon Shamroy.

The film was set in the Belgian Congo in 1907.

Plot
The arrival of nurse Ellen Burton to the Belgian Congo is unwelcome to hunter John "Lonni" Douglas (Robert Mitchum), who captures animals for zoos. He warns her against traveling upriver to join a female doctor who is working with native tribesmen.

Short of money, Lonni is intrigued when partner Huysman (Walter Slezak) tells him there is gold to be found in the region where Ellen will be traveling. Lonni volunteers to accompany her, along with gun bearer Jacques (Ajala).

Ellen (Susan Hayward) is a widow who once discouraged her physician husband from his dream of coming to Africa to give medical aid. She talks a witch doctor out of killing a woman with an abscessed tooth. Upset with her, the witch doctor places a deadly tarantula in Ellen's tent.

The doctor she is there to assist has died of fever. The king is pleased when his son is saved from a lion by Lonni, his wounds treated by Ellen, but then the king takes her hostage when Huysman, heavily armed, arrives to search for gold. Huysman's men knock Lonni unconscious and tie him up, but Jacques sacrifices his own life to save that of Lonni, who returns to Ellen's side for good.

Cast
 Robert Mitchum as Lonni Douglas
 Susan Hayward as Ellen Burton
 Walter Slezak as Huysman
 Timothy Carey as Jarrett
 Mashood Olabisi Ajala as Jacques

Production
The original director was Roy Ward Baker but he fell ill on location in Africa and was replaced by Henry Hathaway.

Hathaway filmed footage in Africa, but the majority of the film was shot on Fox's studio backlot.  The head of 20th Century Fox, Darryl F. Zanuck, demanded that the original story of [Emily] Louise Allender Stinetorf (who had been a Quaker missionary in Palestine) be jettisoned for action and a love story.

Notes

External links
 
 
 
 

1953 films
1950s English-language films
1953 adventure films
Films based on American novels
20th Century Fox films
Films directed by Henry Hathaway
Films scored by Bernard Herrmann
Films set in Belgian Congo
Films set in 1907
American adventure films
1950s American films
Films about witch doctors